George Silas Peters (October 11, 1846 – August 27, 1928) was the 27th mayor of Columbus, Ohio and the 24th person to serve in that office.   He served Columbus for one term.  His successor, Charles C. Walcutt, took office in 1883.  He died on August 27, 1928.

References

Bibliography

External links 

George Silas Peters at Political Graveyard

Mayors of Columbus, Ohio
1846 births
1928 deaths
Burials at Green Lawn Cemetery (Columbus, Ohio)
People from Pickaway County, Ohio
Ohio Democrats